This is a list of Missouri suffragists, suffrage groups and others associated with the cause of women's suffrage in Missouri.

Groups 

 Carthage Equal Suffrage Association, formed in 1897.
 Columbia Equal Suffrage Association.
 Equal Suffrage Association of Kansas City, led by Kersey Coates and formed in 1892.
 Federated Colored Women's Clubs.
 Jackson County Suffrage Association, formed in 1918.
 Kansas City Woman Suffrage Association, formed in 1911.
 Kansas City Woman's League, formed in 1914.
 Marysville Ladies Marching Band.
 Missouri Equal Suffrage Association (MESA) formed in 1895.
 Political Equality Club of Warrensburg, formed in 1911.
 St. Louis Business Women's Suffrage League, formed in 1912.
 St. Louis County Equal Suffrage Association, formed in 1870.
 St. Louis Equal Suffrage League, formed in 1910.
 Wednesday Club, formed in 1890 by Kate Chopin and Charlotte Eliot.
 Woman Suffrage Association of Missouri, formed in St. Louis in May 1867.

Suffragists 

 Penelope Allen (St. Louis).
 Annie White Baxter (Jasper County).
 Emily Newell Blair (Jasper County).
Martha H. Brinkerhoff.
 Margaret Burke (St. Louis).
 Marie Ruoff Byrum (Hannibal).
Julia Shipley Carroll (St. Louis)
 Anna Clapp (St. Louis).
 Sarah Chandler Coates (Kansas City).
 Myrtle Foster Cook (Kansas City).
 Adaline Couzins (St. Louis).
 Phoebe Couzins (St. Louis).
 Phoebe Jane Ess (Kansas City).
 Edna Gellhorn (St. Louis).
 Lucretia Hall (St. Louis).
 Ella Harrison (Carthage).
 Rosa Russell Ingels (Columbia).
 Victoria Clay Haley (St. Louis).
 Rebecca Hazard (St. Louis).
 Virginia Hedges (Warrensburg).
 Ida Joyce Jackson (Jefferson City).
 Frances C. Jenkins (Kansas City)
 Addie M. Johnson.
 Marguerite Martyn (St. Louis).
 Helen Guthrie Miller (Columbia).
 Francis Minor (St. Louis).
 Virginia Minor (St. Louis).
 Jessie Moller (St. Louis).
 Ella Moffatt.
 Luella Wilcox St. Clair Moss (Columbia).
 Alma Nash (Marysville).
 Kate Richards O'Hare (St. Louis).
 Barbara Blackman O'Neil (St. Louis).
Mary Whitney Phelps.
 Florence Wyman Richardson (St. Louis).
 Cecilia Razovsky (St. Louis).
 Alma Gibson Robb (St. Louis).
 Charlotte Rumbold (St. Louis).
 Laura Runyon (Warrensburg).
 Mary Semple Scott (St. Louis).
 Martha Taaffe (Jasper County).
 Genevieve Tierney (St. Louis).
 Alice Curtice Moyer Wing (St. Louis).
 Victoria Conkling Whitney (St. Louis).
 Fannie C. Williams (St. Louis).

Politicians supporting women's suffrage 

 B. Gratz Brown.
 Perl Decker (Joplin).

Publications 
The Missouri Woman.

Places 

St. Louis Mercantile Library.

Suffragists who campaigned in Missouri 

 Jane Addams.
 Susan B. Anthony.
Ethel Arnold.
Florence Balgarnie.
Henry Blackwell.
Mary C. C. Bradford.
 Madeline McDowell Breckenridge.
Mary Waldo Calkins.
Carrie Chapman Catt.
 Marion Cole.
Hannah Cutler.
 Dorothy Dix.
Clara C. Hoffman.
Julia Ward Howe.
Mary Seymour Howell.
Mary Livermore.
 Anne Henrietta Martin.
Lucia Ames Mead.
Lena Morrow.
Emmeline Pankhurst, invited.
Sylvia Pankhurst.
Frances Squire Potter.
Anna Howard Shaw.
Anna R. Simmons.
Elizabeth Cady Stanton.
Lucy Stone.
Charles Burlingame Waite.

See also 

 Timeline of women's suffrage in Missouri
 Women's suffrage in Missouri
 Women's suffrage in the United States

References

Sources 

 
 
 
 
 
 
 
 
 

Missouri suffrage

Missouri suffragists
Activists from Missouri
History of Missouri
Suffragists